Ajanti railway station is a small railway station in Khandwa district, Madhya Pradesh. Its code is ANI. It serves Ajanti village. The station consists of a single platform. The platform is not well sheltered. It lacks many facilities including water and sanitation. In 2015, gauge conversion started on this line. After conversion it will connect Indore to South India.

Major trains

Some of the important trains that runs from Ajanti are :

 Akola–Mhow MG Passenger (unreserved)
 Akola–Mhow MG Fast Passenger
 Akola–Mhow MG Fast Passenger
 Akola–Mhow MG Passenger
 Khandwa–Mhow MG Passenger (unreserved)
 Khandwa–Mhow MG Passenger (unreserved)

Controversy 
In April 2004, a station master was caught stealing kerosene that was supposed to be for the station generator.

References

Railway stations in Khandwa district
Ratlam railway division
Railway stations opened in 1904
1904 establishments in India